The Central States Intercollegiate Conference (CSIC) was an American intercollegiate athletic conference affiliated with the National Association of Intercollegiate Athletics (NAIA) from 1976 to 1989. It was known to be one of the toughest NAIA conferences in the nation.

History
In 1976, four members from the Great Plains Athletic Conference decided to move away from that conference, which was affiliated with the Rocky Mountain Athletic Conference and form the Central States Intercollegiate Conference (CSIC). Those were Fort Hays State College (now Fort Hays State University), Kansas State College of Emporia (now Emporia State University), Kansas State College of Pittsburg (now Pittsburg State University) and Washburn University. Other institutions who joined the CSIC were Kearney State College (now the University of Nebraska at Kearney) and Wayne State College, who competed in the Nebraska College Conference; and Missouri Southern State College (now Missouri Southern State University) and Missouri Western State College (now Missouri Southern State University), who competed as NAIA independents.

In 1987, all institutions in the CSIC applied for NCAA membership, with the announcement of four schools Missouri Southern, Missouri Western, Pittsburg State and Washburn already becoming a member of the Missouri Intercollegiate Athletics Association (MIAA, now the Mid-America Intercollegiate Athletics Association), effective beginning in the 1989–90 school year.

Member schools

Final members
The CSIC consisted of eight members:

Notes

Membership timeline

Sports

References

 
Sports organizations established in 1976
Organizations disestablished in 1989
Sports leagues disestablished in 1989
1976 establishments in the United States
1989 disestablishments in the United States
Sports in the Midwestern United States